Abida Muhammad Azeem is a Pakistani politician who has been a Member of the Senate of Pakistan since March 2018.

Political career
Azeem was elected to the Senate of Pakistan as an independent candidate on reserved seat for women from Balochistan in 2018 Pakistani Senate election. She took oath as Senator on 12 March 2018.

References

Living people
Year of birth missing (living people)
Place of birth missing (living people)
Members of the Senate of Pakistan
21st-century Pakistani women politicians